Armando Ríos (born September 13, 1971) is a left-handed outfielder who played in Major League Baseball from 1998 through 2003.

Career
Rios played center field for Louisiana State University from 1991 to 1993.

Armando Ríos first reached the majors in 1998 with the San Francisco Giants, spending part of four seasons with them before moving to the Pittsburgh Pirates (2001–02) and Chicago White Sox (2003). His most productive season came in 2001, when he hit .260 in 95 games and posted career-highs in home runs (14), RBI (50), runs (38), hits (83) and doubles (17).

Since his last MLB season, Rios has played in the Pacific, International, and Atlantic leagues.

In 2006, Ríos played with the Algodoneros de Guasave in the Mexican Pacific League. In 2008, Ríos played for the Tigres del Licey in the Dominican Winter Baseball League. Currently, Ríos is playing baseball in Carolina, Puerto Rico.

Ríos is an admitted user of performance-enhancing drugs, testifying in the BALCO case after surgeries on his knee, elbow, and shoulder. He is one of the players mentioned in the 2007 Mitchell Report.

See also
 List of Major League Baseball players from Puerto Rico
 List of Major League Baseball players named in the Mitchell Report

References

External links
  
Baseball Library

1971 births
Living people
Altoona Curve players
Baseball players at the 1991 Pan American Games
Charlotte Knights players
Chicago White Sox players
Clinton LumberKings players
Fresno Grizzlies players
Long Island Ducks players
Major League Baseball right fielders
Major League Baseball players from Puerto Rico
Memphis Redbirds players
Nashville Sounds players
Ottawa Lynx players
Pan American Games medalists in baseball
Pan American Games silver medalists for Puerto Rico
People from Santurce, Puerto Rico
Puerto Rican expatriate baseball players in Canada
Puerto Rican expatriate baseball players in Mexico
Pittsburgh Pirates players
San Francisco Giants players
San Jose Giants players
Shreveport Captains players
Toros de Tijuana players
Medalists at the 1991 Pan American Games